Giacomo Acerbo, Baron of Aterno (25 July 1888 – 9 January 1969) was an Italian economist and  politician who  drafted the Acerbo Law.

Early life
He was born to an old family of the local nobility of Loreto Aprutino.

He was educated in Pisa, graduating in agricultural sciences from the University of Pisa in 1912. Acerbo's affiliation with the Freemasons led him to become an advocate of irredentism and Italy's entry to World War I. When war exploded upon the continent, he volunteered for military service. By the end of the war, he was decorated with three silver medals for military valor and promoted to the rank of captain.

Acerbo resumed his work as an assistant professor in the faculty of economics, and planned for a university career. At the same time, he promoted the Association of Servicemen of Teramo and Chieti (l'Associazione dei combattenti di Teramo e Chieti), which broke away from the national association after the election of 1919 and became the Provincial Combat Group (il Fascio di combattimento provinciale).

Fascism
Elected to the Italian Chamber of Deputies in 1921 with the "national bloc", he acted as a mediator between local conservative forces and the Blackshirts; on a national level, Acerbo ensured peace in the open conflict between the Italian Socialist Party and Fascists, and was elected to a leadership position inside the National Fascist Party (PNF). During the March on Rome, Acerbo presided the Chamber as the coup d'état unfolded, and acted as the link between the PNF and King Victor Emmanuel III. He then accompanied Mussolini as he was designated Prime Minister, and became his undersecretary.

He made the Acerbo Law pass in November 1923; he was again deputy in 1924, winning his nobiliary title. Acerbo was marginally involved in the inquiry over Giacomo Matteotti's killing, and left his position in the government. In 1924 he instituted the Coppa Acerbo in memory of his brother Tito Acerbo (a war hero). Giacomo Acerbo was elected vice-president of the Chamber in 1926, and was Agriculture and Forestry Minister from 1929, dedicating himself to projects for universally-extended drainage. Together with Gabriele D'Annunzio, he contributed to the creation of Pescara Province in January 1927.

Acerbo became head of the Economics and Commerce Faculty at the University of Rome in 1934, and, from 1935 to 1943, president of the International Agricultural Institute. A member of the Grand Council of Fascism, he was a spokesman for the project that turned the Chamber into a representative of Fasci and Corporazioni.

When World War II began and Italy joined the Nazi German offensive, Acerbo served as member of the Italian Army General Staff during the marginal Italian maneuver in the Battle of France, and the Greek campaign. He was also Minister of Finance from February 1943.

The split with Mussolini and later life

Being a staunch and ardent Mediterraneanist, Acerbo first became outwardly critical of Mussolini when Mussolini began, at least in public, to embrace Nazi Nordicist theories and policies. Acerbo was critical of Nazi Nordicism, as Nazi Nordicism inherently classified Italians and other Mediterranean people as inferior or degenerate to Nordic and Germanic people. With the rise of pro-Nordicist Nazi Germany, and as Fascist Italy allied closer with Nazi Germany, the Fascist regime gave Italian Nordicists prominent positions in the National Fascist Party (PNF), which aggravated the original Mediterraneanists in the party, like Acerbo. In 1941, the PNF's Mediterraneanists, led by Acerbo, put forward a comprehensive definition of the Italian race as primarily Mediterranean. The Mediterraneanists were derailed by Mussolini's endorsement of Nordicist figures with the appointment of Nordicist Alberto Luchini as head of Italy's Racial Office in May 1941, as well as with Mussolini becoming interested with Evola's spiritual Nordicism in late 1941. Acerbo and the Mediterraneanists in his High Council on Demography and Race sought to return Italian Fascism to Mediterraneanism by denouncing the pro-Nordicist Manifesto of the Racial Scientists.

On July 25, 1943, Acerbo sided with Dino Grandi when the latter attempted to topple Mussolini and take Italy out of the war. He voted in favor of the motion (Ordine del giorno Grandi) that stripped Il Duce of his powers, and took refuge in his home region, the Allied-occupied Abruzzo - after Mussolini regained some standing with help from the Nazis, establishing the Italian Social Republic, one that proscribed all opponents (including Acerbo) during the Verona trial. Captured by the Resistance, Acerbo was sentenced to death by the High Court of Justice, a verdict lessened to 48 years in prison. This sentence too was overturned, and Acerbo's name was cleared in 1951, enabling him to resume his teaching career. He received numerous distinctions and titles in academia, and was awarded a gold medal (in Education, Culture, and Arts) by President Antonio Segni.

In the elections of 1953 and 1958, Acerbo was an unsuccessful candidate of the Monarchist National Party to the Italian Parliament.

Acerbo died in Rome in 1969.

He is also remembered for his passion as a collector of ancient pottery, and created a Gallery dedicated to ceramics of the Abruzzo.

References

External links
 

1888 births
1969 deaths
People from the Province of Pescara
Barons of Italy
Members of the Grand Council of Fascism
Monarchist National Party politicians
Agriculture ministers of Italy
Mussolini Cabinet
Finance ministers of Italy
Deputies of Legislature XXVI of the Kingdom of Italy
Deputies of Legislature XXVII of the Kingdom of Italy
Deputies of Legislature XXVIII of the Kingdom of Italy
Deputies of Legislature XXIX of the Kingdom of Italy
Members of the Chamber of Fasces and Corporations
Italian economists
Italian Freemasons
University of Pisa alumni
Italian military personnel of World War I
Italian military personnel of World War II
Italian people of World War II
Knights Grand Cross of the Order of Saints Maurice and Lazarus
Recipients of the Grand Cross of the Order of Leopold II